Zosin may refer to the following places:
Zosin, Golub-Dobrzyń County in Kuyavian-Pomeranian Voivodeship (north-central Poland)
Zosin, Włocławek County in Kuyavian-Pomeranian Voivodeship (north-central Poland)
Zosin, Hrubieszów County in Lublin Voivodeship (east Poland)
Zosin, Krasnystaw County in Lublin Voivodeship (east Poland)
Zosin, Lublin County in Lublin Voivodeship (east Poland)
Zosin, Łódź Voivodeship (central Poland)
Zosin, Łęczna County in Lublin Voivodeship (east Poland)
Zosin, Opole Lubelskie County in Lublin Voivodeship (east Poland)
Zosin, Ryki County in Lublin Voivodeship (east Poland)
Zosin, Masovian Voivodeship (east-central Poland)
Zosin, Greater Poland Voivodeship (west-central Poland)